Haissam Hussain is a Pakistani television and film director known for directed a number of critically acclaimed television serials such as Noorpur Ki Rani (2009), Akbari Asghari (2011), Durr-e-Shehwar (2012) and Aunn Zara (2013). He made his cinematic debut by directing romantic-comedy Balu Mahi (2017). Hussain directed the period play Dastaan (2010) which earned him critical praise and several accolades including the Lux Style Award for Best television director.

Personal life
Hussain was born to a Muslim family in Lahore, Pakistan. He has studied at a handful of universities, including the Army Burn Hall College in 1992, Punjab University in 1996, West Herts College in 2002 and Middlesex University in 2006. He directed his first telefilm Beetay Pal in 2007. He is married and the couple has 2 daughters and one son.

Career 
Hussain got fame with television serial Noorpur Ki Rani. He then directed romamce Ishq Gumshuda, period-romance Dastaan, social domestic-drama Durr-e-Shehwar, coming of age Aik Nayee Cinderella, dark humour Akbari Asghari and romantic comedy Aunn Zara.

In 2017, he ventured into cinema by directing romantic comedy Balu Mahi. He also directed small part of Bin Roye and then left it due to unknown reasons.

In 2021, Hussain debut as a producer and made television comeback by directing political-period drama Jo Bichar Gaye.

Filmography 
 Taming of the Shrew (2012)
 Bin Roye (2015)
 Balu Mahi  (2017)

Television

Telefilms

Single Plays

Short films

2006 - No Regrets

Awards and accolades

References

External links
 

Living people
Year of birth missing (living people)
Pakistani television directors
People from Lahore
Hum Award winners
Pakistani film directors
Army Burn Hall College alumni